Cambyses I ( Kabūjiya) was king of Anshan from c. 580 to 559 BC and the father of Cyrus the Great (Cyrus II), younger son of Cyrus I, and brother of Arukku. He should not be confused with his better-known grandson Cambyses II.

Etymology 
The origins of the name of "Cambyses" ( Kabūjiya) is disputed in scholarship; according to some scholars, the name is of Elamite origin, whilst others associate it with Kambojas, an Iranian people who inhabited northwestern India. The name of Cambyses is known in other languages as; Elamite Kanbuziya; Akkadian Kambuziya; Aramaic Kanbūzī.

Background 
No records composed during Cambyses' lifetime have survived. Cambyses was an early member of the Achaemenid dynasty. He was apparently a great-grandson of its founder Achaemenes, grandson of Teispes and son of Cyrus I. His paternal uncle was Ariaramnes and his first cousin was Arsames.

Personal life
According to Herodotus, Cambyses was "a man of good family and quiet habits". He reigned under the overlordship of Astyages, King of Media. He was reportedly married to Princess Mandane of Media, a daughter of Astyages and Princess Aryenis of Lydia. His wife was reportedly a granddaughter of both Cyaxares of Media and Alyattes of Lydia. The result of their marriage was the birth of his successor Cyrus the Great. According to Nicolas of Damascus his original name was Atradates, and he was wounded and later died in the Battle of the Persian Border which he, with his son, fought against Astyages. It occurred in about 551 BC, and he is reported to have received an honorable burial.

Also according to Herodotus, Astyages chose Cambyses as a son-in-law because he considered him to pose no threat to the Median throne, having dreamt his daughter would give birth to one who would rule Asia. This was not quite the case with Cyrus the Great who would go on to depose his grandfather, and to begin the Persian Empire.

References

Sources
 
 

600s BC births
559 BC deaths
6th-century BC Iranian people
6th-century BC monarchs
Kings of Anshan (Persia)
Teispids